is a retired Japanese wrestler who won a gold medal in the flyweight class at the 1964 Olympics. He competed at the 1958 and 1967 world championships and finished in sixth and third place, respectively.

References

External links

 
 
 

1940 births
Living people
Olympic wrestlers of Japan
Wrestlers at the 1964 Summer Olympics
Japanese male sport wrestlers
Olympic gold medalists for Japan
Nippon Sport Science University alumni
Olympic medalists in wrestling
Asian Games medalists in wrestling
Wrestlers at the 1962 Asian Games
People from Shimonoseki
World Wrestling Championships medalists
Medalists at the 1964 Summer Olympics
Asian Games silver medalists for Japan
Medalists at the 1962 Asian Games
20th-century Japanese people
21st-century Japanese people